Anaheim is a city in Orange County, California.

Anaheim may also refer to:

 Anaheim Hills
 Anaheim pepper
 Anaheim Regional Transportation Intermodal Center
 Anaheim Street station

See also
 Annaheim (disambiguation)